The Eastern precinct was one of three components of Somerset County, New Jersey, United States, that was created circa 1745 and existed until 1798. It was spelled in records as Estering from 1766-1777, and as Eastern from 1780-1797.

The Eastern precinct, together with the Northern precinct and Western precinct, were created as administrative divisions of Somerset County, while still under British colonial rule.

On February 21, 1798, the remaining portions of the Eastern precinct were taken to form Franklin Township as one of the first 104 townships created in New Jersey. With the formation of Franklin Township, Eastern precinct was dissolved.

References

Former municipalities in New Jersey
Geography of Somerset County, New Jersey